Zirrah (also Romanized as Zīrrāh; also known as Şaḩrā-ye Zīr Rāh) is a village in Mongasht Rural District, in the Central District of Bagh-e Malek County, Khuzestan Province, Iran. At the 2006 census its population was 285, with 57 families residing.

References 

Populated places in Bagh-e Malek County